En Sugawara (27 February 1900 – 16 February 1994) was a Japanese suffragist and politician. She was one of the first group of women elected to the House of Representatives in 1946.

Biography
She also became a member of the Iwate Poets' Association.

After World War II, Sugawara joined the Japan Progressive Party. She was a JPP candidate in Iwate in the 1946 general elections (the first in which women could vote), and was elected to the House of Representatives. She subsequently contested the 1949 elections as an independent candidate, but failed to be elected.

She died in 1994.

References

1900 births
Japanese farmers
20th-century Japanese women politicians
20th-century Japanese politicians
Members of the House of Representatives (Japan)
Japan Progressive Party politicians
Democratic Party (Japan, 1947) politicians
1994 deaths